D-subminiature connectors are used to carry balanced analog or digital audio on many multichannel professional audio equipment, where the use of XLR connectors is impractical, for example due to space constraints.
The most common usage is the DB25, using TASCAM's pinout (now standardised in AES59). To avoid the possibility of bent pins on fixed equipment, the male connector is generally fitted to the cabling and the female connector to the equipment. The DD50 connector usage is described in AES-2id.

Notes and references 

Audiovisual connectors